
The New Zealand Bravery Medal (NZBM) is the fourth-level civil decoration of New Zealand.

It was instituted by Royal Warrant on 20 September 1999 as part of the move to replace British bravery awards with an indigenous New Zealand Bravery system.  The medal, which may be awarded posthumously, is granted in recognition of "acts of bravery".  The medal is primarily a civilian award, but it is also awarded to members of the armed forces who perform acts of bravery in non-operational circumstances (given that the New Zealand gallantry awards may only be awarded "while involved in war and warlike operational service (including peacekeeping)".

Bars are awarded to the NZBM in recognition of the performance of further acts of bravery meriting the award.  Recipients are entitled to the postnominal letters NZBM.

The medal replaced the award of the Queen's Commendation for Brave Conduct and the Queen's Commendation for Valuable Service in the Air in respect of acts of bravery in, or meriting recognition by, New Zealand.

See also
 Orders, decorations, and medals of New Zealand
 New Zealand gallantry awards
 New Zealand bravery awards
 New Zealand campaign medals

Notes

References
 Mackay, J and Mussel, J (eds) - Medals Yearbook - 2005, (2004), Token Publishing.

External links
 New Zealand Bravery Medal, New Zealand Defence Force
 The New Zealand Bravery Awards, Department of the Prime Minister and Cabinet – list of awardees

Civil awards and decorations of New Zealand
Courage awards